Beaver Brook flows into the Mohawk River near Herkimer, New York.

References 

Rivers of Herkimer County, New York
Mohawk River
Rivers of New York (state)